Dinia subapicalis is a moth of the family Erebidae. It was described by Francis Walker in 1854. It is found in Peru.

References

Euchromiina
Moths described in 1854